The Campeonato Carioca Série A2 is the football second level of the First Division annual competition among clubs in the state of Rio de Janeiro, Brazil. Usually, the champion of the level is promoted in the next season to the Campeonato Carioca. It is under the authority of the FERJ or FFERJ (Football Federation of the State of Rio de Janeiro).

List of champions

Following is the list with all the champions of the second level of Rio de Janeiro and their different nomenclatures over the years.

Distrito Federal do Rio de Janeiro

Divisão de Acesso

Taça Francis Walter

Segunda Divisão

Estado da Guanabara

Divisão de Acesso

Estado do Rio de Janeiro

Divisão de Acesso

Segunda Divisão

Módulo Intermediário

Módulo Especial

Módulo Extra

Segunda Divisão

Série B

Série B1

Série A2

Notes

Fidalgo is the currently Madureira EC.
Porto Alegre is the currently Itaperuna EC.
Barreira is the currently Boavista SC.
AA Cabofriense was refounded as AD Cabofriense in 1997 by the same directors with the aim of separating football from the social club activities.
In 1921 and 1922, respectively, Vila Isabel and Vasco da Gama won the Group B of the LMDT Championship, however, Group B was also officially part of the first level, not being considered these titles of the second division.

Titles by team

Teams in bold stills active.

By city

See also
 Campeonato Carioca Série A1 
 Campeonato Carioca Série B1 
 Campeonato Carioca Série B2

References

External links
  FFERJ website
 Second Level champions at RSSSF
 Third Level champions at RSSSF
 Best Attendances in Campeonato Carioca at RSSSF
 Matches when cariocas titles were decided in Laranjeiras Stadium at RSSSF